Constitution Hill is a suburb of Sydney in the state of New South Wales, Australia. Constitution Hill overlooks the city of Parramatta from above and contains views of the inner Sydney city skyline.

History
The area was originally a locality within the suburb of Wentworthville. Constitution Hill was promoted from a locality to a suburb by the Geographical Names Board of New South Wales on 19 January 2007.

There are a few houses built prior to the suburb's development which still remain, although none are heritage listed. Examples include 17A and 53 Fraser Street, which were possibly 2 of the 3 brick homes built by J.C. Page for local farmer David Johnston's family members, the third house likely being 15 Fitzwilliam Road, Old Toongabbie, right on the border of Constitution Hill.

Demographics

At the 2016 census, there were 3,966 residents in Constitution Hill. 61.0% of residents were born in Australia. The most common countries of birth were India 3.9%, China 3.8% and Lebanon 3.2%. 55.1% of people only spoke English at home. Other languages spoken at home included Arabic 7.7%, Cantonese 3.4% and Mandarin 3.2%. The most common responses for religion were Catholic 27.8%, No Religion 19.9% and Anglican 11.1%. The median weekly household income was $1,443 which was slightly below the national median of $1,486.

Historical significance
Constitution Hill was one of the places that was involved in the Castle Hill convict rebellion. The mostly Irish convicts would travel from Castle Hill down modern-day Old Windsor Road and meet at Constitution Hill. The distraction they had made at Castle Hill (A fire (?)) was supposed to stretch out the government forces by allocating some men to go to Castle Hill. The convicts would then attack Parramatta (The head of the colony at that time) and take over control.

The government officials had suspicion that the convicts were planning an attack on Parramatta and kept most of their forces at Parramatta, thinking that the convicts were at Toongabbie, they set out west, only to be informed that they were at Constitution Hill. When the government forces arrived at the summit of Constitution Hill (Mount Dorothy), they realised that the men had not made it that far yet and were further west at Rouse Hill. This site is now Caloola Road Reserve, which features multiple plaques commemorating the rebellion.

Commercial area 
The only commercial area in the suburb is Constitution Hill Shops, which features 14 shops, a library and a park. It is located near the very centre of the suburb, on the corner of Emma Crescent and Hollis Street, with further access through Bulli Road and Greenleaf Street. One of these shops, a pizza restaurant, was used as the pizza shop in the filming of the Fat Pizza TV series.

Schools 
Primary Schools

 Toongabbie East Public School

Toongabbie East Public School is one of the smallest schools in New South Wales, and in 2015, there was only 53 students and 4 teachers. It is also the only school within the suburb's boundaries.

References

Suburbs of Sydney
City of Parramatta